This is a list of the districts of Turku, Finland, sorted by population .

 Runosmäki (Runosbacken), 10,269
 Varissuo (Kråkkärret), 8,760
 VII, 8,749
 Nummi (Nummis), 7,011
 VI, 6,187
 I, 6,177
 VIII - Port Arthur, 4,760
 Pääskyvuori (Svalberga), 4,482
 Luolavuori, 4,477
 Pahaniemi, 4,397
 IV - Martti (Martins), 4,357
 Vasaramäki (Hammarbacka), 3,949
 Harittu, 3,870
 V - Itäranta (Öststranden), 3,677
 Uittamo, 3,635
 Teräsrautela, 3,554
 Halinen (Hallis), 3,501
 Jäkärlä, 3,460
 Lauste (Laustis), 3,405
 III, 3,222
 Vätti, 2,990
 Kurala, 2,956
 Itäharju (Österås), 2,940
 II, 2,919
 Pansio, 2,905
 Ilpoinen (Ilpois), 2,889
 Pitkämäki (Långbacka), 2,886
 Perno, 2,513
 Paattinen (Patis), 2,430
 Ruohonpää, 2,375
 Yli-Maaria (Övre S:t Marie), 2,209
 Kaerla, 2,182
 Kärsämäki, 2,021
 Kastu, 2,002
 Räntämäki, 1,924
 Iso-Heikkilä (Storheikkilä), 1,905
 Moikoinen (Moikois), 1,880
 Koivula (Björkas), 1,761
 Mälikkälä, 1,608
 Pohjola (Norrstan), 1,569
 Mäntymäki (Tallbacka), 1,489
 Kukola, 1,486
 Raunistula, 1,442
 IX - Länsiranta (Väststranden), 1,386
 Haarla (Harlax), 1,316
 Katariina (Katarina), 1,282
 Kohmo, 1,223
 Vähäheikkilä (Lillheikkilä), 1,153
 Pihlajaniemi (Rönnudden), 1,139
 Huhkola, 986
 Vaala (Svalas), 972
 Kähäri, 934
 Peltola, 778
 Satava, 764
 Puistomäki (Parkbacken), 734
 Kurjenmäki (Tranbacken), 679
 Kakskerta, 633
 Kaistarniemi (Kaistarudden), 630
 Saramäki (Starbacka), 530
 Ispoinen (Ispois), 480
 Korppolaismäki (Korppolaisbacken), 349
 Lauttaranta (Färjstranden), 236
 Pikisaari (Beckholmen), 226
 Oriniemi, 161
 Papinsaari, 158
 Skanssi (Skansen), 141
 Turku Airport (Turun lentoasema / Åbo flygstation), 127
 Ruissalo (Runsala), 126
 Oriketo, 120
 Särkilahti, 111
 Maanpää, 107
 Toijainen (Toijais), 102
 Illoinen (Illois), 85
 Artukainen (Artukais), 78
 Port of Turku (Turun satama / Åbo hamn), 44
 Jänessaari, 26
 Koroinen (Korois), 26
 Friskala, 23
 Kupittaa (Kuppis), 9